Ekene Emigo  (born 24 November 1984 in Edo State) is a Nigerian footballer. He currently plays for Enyimba.

Career 
On 1 December 2005, Emigo along with teammate Kabiru Isah moved from Enugu Rangers to Enyimba. Emigo was set to join up with Leicester City F.C. during the January transfer window 2009.

References

1984 births
Living people
Nigerian footballers
Nigeria international footballers
Rangers International F.C. players
Association football defenders
Enyimba F.C. players